Ameira Punvani is an Indian costume designer and celebrity stylist who works in Hindi cinema (Bollywood).

Career 
Punvani started her film career with Let's Enjoy in 2004. She got her big banner break with Yash Raj Films' Bunty Aur Babli in 2005 & Badmaash Company in 2010. She got noticed for her work in the period drama film Guru in 2007 directed by Mani Ratnam, for which she was nominated for the Filmfare Award for Best Costume Design and in the crime thriller film Rustom in 2016 directed by Tinu Suresh Desai, for which she was nominated for the Stardust Award for Best Costume Design. She was further lauded for her work in the crime drama film(s) David in 2013 directed by Bejoy Nambiar, by a blog - 'The Lazy Critic' which gave her the TLC award for 'Best Costume'.

Personal life 
Punvani is friends with film director Zoya Akhtar & actress Anushka Sharma, the latter whom she met on the sets of the Yash Raj Film, Badmaash Company in 2010. The two have maintained their friendship since, with Punvani being one of the few select guests invited to attend the actor's wedding to cricketer Virat Kohli in Tuscany, Italy in 2017. The two are often seen being affectionate towards each other on social media. Punvani was a guest at ASmallWorld / ASW's winter weekend gala held in Gstaad, Switzerland in 2013, along with actress Kangana Ranaut from India. She married her longtime boyfriend, actor Shiv Panditt in a private ceremony in New Delhi on 18 April 2018. The news of her wedding was shared by her close friends, Zoya Akhtar & Anushka Sharma via their respective Instagram handles.

Filmography

Feature films 
 Let's Enjoy (2004) - Directed by Siddharth Anand Kumar & Ankur Tewari - Styled the costumes for Aashish Chaudhary, Arzoo Govitrikar, Roshni Chopra, Vinod Sharawat & Shiv Panditt 
 Bunty Aur Babli (2005) - Directed by Shaad Ali - (Associate Costume Designer) - Styled the costumes for Prem Chopra, Raj Babbar, Puneet Issar, Kiran Juneja, Sanjay Mishra, Ravi Baswani, Virendra Saxena, Yunus Parvez, Tania Zaetta, Rajesh Vivek, Ranjeet, Lilliput, Rameshwari, Antara Biswas & Shaad Ali 
 Zinda (2006) - Directed by Sanjay Gupta - Styled the costumes for Sanjay Dutt, Celina Jaitly, Raj Zutshi & Mahesh Manjrekar 
 Banras (2006) - Directed by Pankaj Parashar - Styled the costumes for Urmila Matondkar, Raj Babbar, Ashmit Patel, Dimple Kapadia, Naseeruddin Shah, Akash Khurana & Arif Zakaria 
 Guru (2007) - Directed by Mani Ratnam - Styled the costumes for Abhishek Bachchan, Aishwarya Rai Bachchan, Mallika Sherawat - Song : Mayya), Arjan Bajwa, Manoj Joshi & Roshan Seth 
 Shortkut: The Con is On (2009) - Directed by Neeraj Vora - Styled the costumes for Akshaye Khanna, Amrita Rao, Chunky Pandey & Tiku Talsania 
 Teen Patti (2010) - Directed by Leena Yadav - Styled the costumes for Amitabh Bachchan, Shaddha Kapoor, Raima Sen, R. Madhavan, Dhruv Ganesh, Siddharth Kher, Vaibhav Talwar, Saira Mohan, Jackie Shroff, Mahesh Manjrekar, Tinnu Anand, Shakti Kapoor & Ranjeet 
 Badmaash Company (2010) - Directed by Parmeet Sethi - Styled the costumes for Shahid Kapoor, Anushka Sharma, Vir Das, Meiyang Chang, Pavan Malhotra, Jameel Khan & Kiran Juneja 
 David (2013) - Directed by Bejoy Nambiar - Styled the costumes for Neil Nitin Mukesh, Tabu, Vinay Virmani, Jiiva, Lara Dutta, Isha Sharvani, Monica Dogra, Milind Soman, Ajinkya Deo, Neil Bhoopalam, Sarika, Nikhil Chinapa, Saurabh Shukla, Satish Kaushik, Nassar, Shweta Pandit, Prahlad Kakkar, Rohini Hattangadi & Sheetal Menon 
 Rustom (2016) - Directed by Tinu Suresh Desai - Styled the costumes for Akshay Kumar, Ileana D'Cruz, Esha Gupta, Arjan Bajwa, Pavan Malhotra, Kumud Mishra, Anang Desai, Sachin Khedekar, Usha Nadkarni, Kanwaljit Singh, Brijendra Kala & Parmeet Sethi 
 Raid (2018) - Directed by Raj Kumar Gupta - Styled the costumes for Ileana D'Cruz
 Romeo Akbar Walter (2019) - Directed by Robbie Grewal - Styled the costumes for John Abraham, Jackie Shroff, Mouni Roy, Sikandar Kher & Suchitra Krishnamoorthi 
 Section 375 (2019) - Directed by Ajay Bahl - Styled the costumes for Akshaye Khanna, Richa Chadha, Rahul Bhat, Shriswara & Meera Chopra

Short films 
 Positive (2007) - Directed by Farhan Akhtar - Styled the costumes for Shabana Azmi, Boman Irani & Arjun Mathur 
 Deja Vu (2012) - Directed by Wong Kar-wai for Chivas Regal - Styled the costumes along with French costume designer Madeline Fontaine 
 Chhuri (2017) - Directed by Mansi Jain - Styled the costumes for Tisca Chopra, Surveen Chawla & Anurag Kashyap 
 The Playboy Mr. Sawhney (2018) - Directed by Tariq Naved Siddiqui - Styled the costumes for Jackie Shroff, Arjan Bajwa, Sudhir Misra, Tahir Raj Bhasin, Divya Dutta, Neetu Chandra, Manjari Fadnis & Pitobash

Television 
 Zara Nachke Dikha (Season 2) - Styled the costumes for Karan Singh Grover

Web series 
 Inside Edge (Season 1) (2017) - Directed by Karan Anshuman - Styled the costumes for Vivek Oberoi, Richa Chadha, Sarah-Jane Dias, Angad Bedi, Tanuj Virwani, Siddhant Chaturvedi, Sayani Gupta, Sanjay Suri & Aahana Kumra

Music videos 
 Ghoom Tana - Duet by : Salman Ahmad & Shubha Mudgal - Directed by Saqib Malik - Styled the costumes for Nandita Das 
 Chalte Chalte - The Haveli Mix - A remix of the song from the film Pakeezah - Styled the costumes for Roshni Chopra * Pathway to the Unknown - Duet by : Amaan Ali Khan & Ayaan Ali Khan - Directed by Shiraz Bhattacharya - Styled the costumes for Amaan Ali Khan & Ayaan Ali Khan 
 Mere Baap Pehle Aap - Title song of the film Mere Baap Pehle Aap - Directed by Priyadarshan - Styled the costumes for Akshaye Khanna 
 Ishq Subhan Allah - Song from the film Mere Baap Pehle Aap - Directed by Priyadarshan - Styled the costumes for Akshaye Khanna 
 Khoya Khoya Chand - The Bartender Mix - A remix of the song from the film Kala Bazar for the film Shaitan - Directed by Bejoy Nambiar - Styled the costumes for Karishma Tanna, Avinash Tiwary, Gulshan Devaiah, Neil Bhoopalam, Rajkummar Rao, Kirti Kulhari & Shiv Panditt 
 Fuk Fuk Fukrey - Title song of the film Fukrey - Directed by Shujaat Saudagar - Styled the costumes for Pulkit Samrat, Ali Fazal, Manjot Singh, Varun Sharma, Priya Anand & Vishakha Singh 
 Lag Gayi Lottery - Song from the film Fukrey - Directed by Shujaat Saudagar - Styled the costumes for Pulkit Samrat, Ali Fazal, Manjot Singh, Varun Sharma, Priya Anand & Vishakha Singh 
 Tan Tan Tan - Sarva Shiksha Abhiyan - Right to Education Scheme (Educational Initiative Video) - Directed by Shujaat Saudagar - Styled the costumes for Anushka Sharma 
 Phool Khil Jayenge - Tikakaran Abhiyan - Child Immunization Scheme (Educational Initiative Video) - Directed by Ruchi Narain - Styled the costumes for Farhan Akhtar 
 Ishq Karenge - Song from the film Bangistan - Directed by Shujaat Saudagar - Styled the costumes for Pulkit Samrat, Jacqueline Fernandez & Riteish Deshmukh 
 Maula - Song from the film Bangistan - Directed by Shujaat Saudagar - Styled the costumes for Pulkit Samrat, Jacqueline Fernandez & Riteish Deshmukh 
 You Know What I Mean - Song from the film Rock On 2 - Directed by Farah Khan - Styled the costumes for Farhan Akhtar, Luke Kenny, Arjun Rampal & Purab Kohli 
 Kudi Daru Wargi Aa - Song from the film Why Cheat India - Directed by Nitin Parmar - Styled the costumes for Emraan Hashmi & Shreya Dhanwanthary

Awards

References

External links 
  
 Ameira Punvani at Bollywood Hungama 
  
  
 

Indian costume designers
Fashion stylists
Artists from Mumbai
Living people
21st-century Indian designers
Women artists from Maharashtra
21st-century Indian women artists
Year of birth missing (living people)